Kotayk may refer to:
Kotayk Province, Armenia
Kotayk (village), a village in Kotayk Province, Armenia
Kotayk Brewery, a brewing company in Abovyan, Armenia
FC Kotayk, an association football club from Abovyan, Armenia
Abovyan City Stadium, an association football stadium in Armenia, known as Kotayk Stadium until 2006